Love146 is a U.S.-based 501(c)(3) non-profit international anti-child trafficking organization.

History 
Love146 was founded in 2002 when the group's co-founders, Rob Morris, Lamont Hiebert, Desirea Rodgers, and Caroline Hahm, went on an exploratory trip to Southeast Asia to see how they could help combat child trafficking. According to Love146, as part of an undercover operation, investigators took several co-founders into a brothel where they witnessed young girls being sold for sex. The girls were given numbers of identification pinned to their dresses. One girl in particular stood out. Morris explained that she stared in their direction with a piercing gaze. Her number was 146. The co-founders returned to the US and began Love146. The vision of Love146 is "the end of child trafficking and exploitation – nothing less." 

Prior to the establishing of Love146, co-founder and president, Rob Morris, worked with Mercy Ships International. Morris has lectured and taught in over 30 countries on issues of justice, compassion, and human rights, and has been featured in the Huffington Post, Fox News, the CNN Freedom Project, and other outlets.

Love146 became an official public charity in March 2004, under the name Justice for Children International. In 2007, the group changed their name to Love146.

Love146 was named an "Agent of Change" by GQ magazine, and earned a Myspace Impact Award for social justice.  Baume & Mercier sent Pulitzer Prize winning photojournalist Carolyn Cole to Southeast Asia to take photos in support of Love146. In 2008, Baume & Mercier hosted an exhibition of her photos in New York City titled "Into the Light".

Heather Fischer, former US government special advisor to the State Department's Trafficking in Persons Office and first special advisor for human trafficking at the White House, started her human rights career at Love146.  

28 states have utilized the curriculum of the organization as of 2022. That year, the organization celebrated its 20th anniversary with a "cutting of the ribbon".

References 

501(c)(3) organizations
Non-profit organizations based in Connecticut